This is a list of sitting members of the House of Commons of the United Kingdom (MPs) who died by assassination or other culpable homicide.

Spencer Perceval is the only British prime minister to have been assassinated, having been shot on 11 May 1812 by John Bellingham, a merchant who blamed the government for his debt. From 1882 to 1990, six MPs were assassinated by Irish nationalists. The murder of Jo Cox on 16 June 2016 was committed by a white supremacist; Cox was both the first female and the first Labour MP to be assassinated. The latest incident, the murder of Sir David Amess on 15 October 2021, was committed by an Islamic terrorist.

List

See also
 Records of members of parliament of the United Kingdom

References 

Lists of assassinations
 
Killed in office
MPs killed in office